Dasypodidae is a family of mostly extinct genera of armadillos.  One genus, Dasypus,  is extant, with at least seven living species.



Classification

Below is a taxonomy of armadillos in this family.

Family Dasypodidae 
† Genus Acantharodeia
† Genus Amblytatus
† Genus Archaeutatus
† Genus Astegotherium
† Genus Barrancatatus
† Genus Chasicotatus
† Genus Chorobates
† Genus Coelutaetus
† Genus Eocoleophorus
† Genus Epipeltecoelus
† Genus Eutatus
† Genus Hemiutaetus
† Genus Isutaetus
† Genus Lumbreratherium
† Genus Macrochorobates
† Genus Mazzoniphractus
† Genus Meteutatus
† Genus Pedrolypeutes
† Genus Prodasypus
† Genus Proeutatus
† Genus Prostegotherium
† Genus Pucatherium
† Genus Punatherium
† Genus Stegotherium
† Genus Stenotatus
† Genus Utaetus
 Subfamily Dasypodinae
† Tribe Astegotheriini
† Genus Nanoastegotherium
† Genus Parastegosimpsonia
† Genus Riostegotherium
† Genus Astegotherium
† Genus Stegosimpsonia
 Tribe Dasypodini
† Genus Anadasypus
 Genus Dasypus
† Genus Pliodasypus
† Genus Propraopus

Phylogeny
Dasypodidae, like Chlamyphoridae, is a basal clade within Cinglata, as shown below. D. kappleri is basal within Dasypodidae.

References

Cingulates
Taxa named by John Edward Gray
Mammal families